Sega Rally Revo (known in Europe as Sega Rally) is an offroad racing video game, the fourth installment of the Sega Rally series. The game was released for PlayStation 3, PlayStation Portable, Xbox 360 and Microsoft Windows in 2007. The game's title is "Revo" as Sega intends it to be a revolution in rally racing games. The game was developed simultaneously with Sega Rally 3.

Gameplay

Cars and tracks 
There are 34 vehicles in total, which are divided into 3 groups: Premier Class (4WD cars), Modified Class (2WD & Super 2000 cars) and Master Class (mostly classic rally cars). There are also several bonus cars—such as Dakar rally types, hill climbers, buggies, etc.—in every class, which can be unlocked with points one as you progress through Championship Mode, plus an overall bonus car for getting 100% in championship mode. The (non-bonus) cars each have 3 different liveries and all have 2 setups. The setup is either off-road, with better grip on loose surfaces, or tarmac, with higher top speed and more grip on hard surfaces. The different environments all feature three tracks (of which some can also be raced in reverse direction - at a different time of day) except for the bonus environment Lakeside that only has a single race track, and again are unlocked as you progress through Championship Mode.

Release date
Sega Rally Revo was released in 2007, September 28 in Europe and September 27 in Australia. A demo was released on Xbox Live on September 18 and on the PlayStation Network on September 20. The PC Demo was released September 28. The US PC release date was originally scheduled for October 30, but was pushed back until November 19. The game has now been made available in all regions.

North American marketing
Part of the promotional activity in North America includes a series of three short comedy films that revolve around the antics of two valley girls as a racing partnership. Titled "Tonya & Donya", the films feature the double act of Natasha Leggero as driver and regular comedy collaborator Melinda Hill, as co-driver.

Each of the films ends with the strapline "Drive like a man".

Development
The game was developed at the SEGA Racing Studio in Solihull, England. There are over 30 different rally cars to choose from, and six different environments, with 16 tracks in total. The game was developed with the GeoDeformation engine, which makes the terrain dynamically deformable, with effects to the cars' performances. Multiplayer mode allows two players to race with split-screen, whereas online multiplayer can be set to up six racers.

Reception

References

External links

Official website (Japanese)

2007 video games
Games for Windows certified games
Off-road racing video games
PlayStation 3 games
PlayStation Portable games
Rally racing video games
Sega video games
Video games developed in Finland
Video games developed in the United Kingdom
Video games set in Africa
Windows games
Xbox 360 games
Multiplayer and single-player video games
Bugbear Entertainment games